The Men's 1 km time trial at the 2006 Commonwealth Games was contested at the Melbourne Multi Purpose Venue on March 16, 2006.

Results

External links
 Results

Track cycling at the 2006 Commonwealth Games
Cycling at the Commonwealth Games – Men's 1 km time trial